Francis Edward Meloy Jr. (March 28, 1917 – June 16, 1976) was a U.S. diplomat murdered in Beirut, Lebanon in 1976 by extreme Lebanese leftist militants.

Early life
Meloy was born in Washington, D.C. on March 28, 1917 to Francis E. Meloy Sr. a government employee and geographer and Anne Teresa Connor. He served in the United States Navy during World War II spending four years in naval intelligence as a reserve officer.

Diplomatic career
After the war, he joined the State Department and 1946 he was posted Dhahran, Saudi Arabia as a vice consul. He returned in 1946 to Washington and served as the personal assistant to Secretary of State Dean Acheson until 1953. He resumed his career as a Foreign Service officer serving as a political officer in Saigon from 1953 until 1956 and then in Paris until 1959. In 1962 he was appointed as the Director of the Office of Western European Affairs until 1964, then as the deputy chief of mission in Rome. He was then promoted, serving as U.S. Ambassador to the Dominican Republic from 1969 to 1973, and Guatemala from 1973 to 1976. On April 21, 1976, President Gerald Ford appointed Meloy as Ambassador to Lebanon after the resignation of G. McMurtrie Godley due to illness. He would be approved by the Senate Foreign Relations Committee on April 27.

Death
At 10:40 on June 16, 1976, in Beirut, Meloy, the incoming U.S. Ambassador to Lebanon, accompanied by Robert O. Waring, the U.S. Economic Counselor, was on his way to present his credentials to the new Lebanese President-elect Elias Sarkis. Meloy, Waring and their driver, Zuhair Mohammed Moghrabi, were kidnapped by Popular Front for the Liberation of Palestine members as they crossed the Green Line, the division between Beirut's Christian and Muslim sectors. Meloy had been in the country a month, but not presented his credentials to the former president Suleiman Franjieh who had taken refuge outside Beirut and refused to step down.

By 21:30, Lebanese television announced their bullet-riddled bodies had been found on a garbage dump near the beach in Ramlet al-Baida.

In 2013, a report released by the CIA said that Meloy was assassinated by an "extreme Lebanese leftist militia" that had links with the PFLP. A succeeding US Ambassador to Lebanon, John Gunther Dean later stated that to the best of his knowledge, the PLO had nothing to do with the murder. The 2013 CIA report noted that the PLO had arrested five over the assassination but released them for lack of sufficient evidence. The PLO handed two culprits to the PFLP and they were later executed, the report added.

See also
Ambassadors of the United States killed in office
List of kidnappings
List of solved missing person cases

References

External links
Presidential Proclamation honoring Ambassador Meloy & Counselor Waring

1917 births
1976 deaths
1976 murders in Lebanon
American terrorism victims
American people murdered abroad
Ambassadors of the United States to the Dominican Republic
Ambassadors of the United States to Guatemala
Ambassadors of the United States to Lebanon
Assassinated American diplomats
Kidnapped diplomats
Kidnapped American people
Missing person cases in Lebanon
Terrorism deaths in Lebanon
People murdered in Lebanon
Deaths by firearm in Lebanon
United States Foreign Service personnel
United States Navy personnel of World War II
People from Washington, D.C.